Glenn Dubis (born February 5, 1959, in Lincoln County, Tennessee) is an American sport shooter. He competed in rifle shooting events at the Summer Olympics in 1984, 1988, 1996, and 2000.

Olympic results

References

1959 births
Living people
ISSF rifle shooters
American male sport shooters
Shooters at the 1984 Summer Olympics
Shooters at the 1988 Summer Olympics
Shooters at the 1996 Summer Olympics
Shooters at the 2000 Summer Olympics
Olympic shooters of the United States
Pan American Games medalists in shooting
Pan American Games gold medalists for the United States
Pan American Games silver medalists for the United States
Pan American Games bronze medalists for the United States
Shooters at the 1987 Pan American Games
Medalists at the 1987 Pan American Games
20th-century American people
21st-century American people